Stenophantes herrerai is a species of beetle in the family Cerambycidae. It was described by Cerda in 1987.

References

Cerambycinae
Beetles described in 1987